Keir Starmer became Leader of the Opposition in the United Kingdom after being elected as Leader of the Labour Party on 4 April 2020. He appointed his Shadow Cabinet on 5 and 6 April.

Background 

Following the Labour Party's defeat in the 2019 general election, its leader Jeremy Corbyn stepped down and triggered a leadership election that would elect a new party leader and a new Leader of the Opposition. Six candidates declared for the election, with three receiving sufficient nominations to advance to the ballot. Keir Starmer, MP for Holborn and St Pancras and Shadow Secretary of State for Exiting the European Union, was elected over Rebecca Long-Bailey and Lisa Nandy.

Shadow Cabinet

November 2021 – present

May 2021 – November 2021

April 2020 – May 2021

Shadow Ministers by department

Other Shadow Ministers were appointed on 9 April 2020.

Shadow C-19 Committee 
Six Shadow Cabinet members are also part of a Shadow COVID-19 committee, created in 2020 and tasked with responding to the current coronavirus outbreak. Chaired by party leader Keir Starmer, the committee includes:

Reshuffles

June 2020 
On 25 June 2020, Rebecca Long-Bailey was sacked as Shadow Secretary of State for Education for sharing an interview with Maxine Peake containing an allegation that Mossad had trained the US police to use the knee-on-neck restraint technique that was used in the murder of George Floyd, described by the Labour leader as "antisemitic conspiracy theories". She was replaced by Kate Green, who in turn was replaced by Karen Buck in her previous role of Shadow Minister for Social Security, renamed from Shadow Minister for Child Poverty Strategy.

May 2021 

On 8 May 2021, Angela Rayner was sacked as Chair of the Labour Party and National Campaign Coordinator after the party's poor performance in the 2021 United Kingdom local elections. She was later moved to Shadow Chancellor of the Duchy of Lancaster and Shadow Minister for the Cabinet Office on 9 May 2021. Also on 9 May 2021, Anneliese Dodds replaced Rayner as Chair and removed from the role of Shadow Chancellor of the Exchequer. In turn, Rachel Reeves replaced Dodds as Shadow Chancellor of the Exchequer, and so left the role she held, the Shadow Chancellor of the Duchy of Lancaster, open for Rayner to be appointed to. Along with this, Opposition Chief Whip Nick Brown, left the Shadow Cabinet and was replaced with Opposition Deputy Chief Whip Alan Campbell.

June 2021 
on 22 June 2021, former MP and Starmer's political secretary Jenny Chapman (ennobled in 2020 as Baroness Chapman of Darlington), was made Shadow Minister of State, sitting in the shadow cabinet, to shadow David Frost, Lord Frost.

November 2021 

In a Shadow Cabinet reshuffle on 29 November 2021, Yvette Cooper returned to the frontbench as Shadow Home Secretary. Pat McFadden joined the shadow cabinet as Shadow Chief Secretary to the Treasury as did Peter Kyle who became Shadow Secretary of State for Northern Ireland. Charlie Falconer, Kate Green, Luke Pollard and Nia Griffith all left. 

Most members of the Shadow Cabinet had their portfolios changed, with Lisa Nandy moving from Foreign Affairs to Shadow Secretary of State for Levelling Up, Housing and Communities (A combination of Housing and Communities and Local Government). Ed Miliband became the revived portfolio of Shadow Secretary of State for Climate Change and Net Zero, with the Business and Industrial Strategy part of his former portfolio going to Jonathan Reynolds. David Lammy took on Foreign Affairs and was replaced as Shadow Lord Chancellor by Steve Reed. Nick Thomas-Symonds became Shadow Secretary of State for International Trade, replacing Emily Thornberry who became Shadow Attorney General for England and Wales. Bridget Phillipson became Shadow Secretary of State for Education, Wes Streeting became Shadow Secretary of State for Health and Social Care, Jonathan Ashworth became Shadow Secretary of State for Work and Pensions, Lucy Powell became Shadow Secretary of State for Digital, Culture, Media and Sport and Jim McMahon became Shadow Secretary of State for Environment, Food and Rural Affairs, Louise Haigh was made Shadow Secretary of State for Transport and Jo Stevens was made Shadow Secretary of State for Wales.

The Shadow Secretaries of State for Mental Health and for International Development were demoted to shadow ministers, but still sitting in the shadow cabinet, at a rank similar to Shadow Chief Secretary to the Treasury.  Preet Gill became Shadow Cabinet Minister for International Development under the Shadow Foreign Secretary and Rosena Allin-Khan became Shadow Cabinet Minister for Mental Health under the Shadow Health Secretary.

The position of Shadow Secretary of State for Housing was combined with Communities and Local Government to become the Shadow Secretary of State for Levelling Up, Housing and Communities, to shadow the government department of the same name. The positions of Shadow Secretary of State for Young People and Democracy, Shadow Secretary of State for Child Poverty and Shadow Secretary of State for Employment Rights and Protections were all abolished. The Shadow Secretary of State for Business, Energy and Industrial Strategy role was split into Shadow Secretary of State for Climate Change and Net Zero and Shadow Secretary of State for Business and Industrial Strategy.

See also 
Frontbench Team of Stephen Flynn
Official Opposition frontbench
Official Opposition Shadow Cabinet (United Kingdom)
His Majesty's Most Loyal Opposition (United Kingdom)
List of British shadow cabinets
List of shadow holders of the Great Offices of State
Cabinet of the United Kingdom
British Government frontbench

Notes

References 

2020 establishments in the United Kingdom
2020 in British politics
British shadow cabinets
Labour Party (UK) shadow cabinets
Official Opposition (United Kingdom)
Keir Starmer